Muhammad Saleem Rajput is a Pakistani politician who had been a Member of the Provincial Assembly of Sindh, from May 2013 to May 2018.

Early life and education
He was born on 28 March 1968 in Sukkur.

He has a degree of Bachelor of Commerce from Shah Abdul Latif University.

Political career

He was elected to the Provincial Assembly of Sindh as a candidate of Mutahida Quami Movement from Constituency PS-1 SUKKUR-I in 2013 Pakistani general election.

References

Living people
Sindh MPAs 2013–2018
1968 births
Muttahida Qaumi Movement politicians
Shah Abdul Latif University alumni